Benjamin James Dadley (1 June 1898 – 18 January 1962) was an English professional footballer who played in the Football League for Charlton Athletic as an inside right. His style of play was characterised as "play hard, tackle hard and only knows defeat when the final whistle has sounded".

Personal life 
Dadley served in the 22nd Battalion of the London Regiment during the First World War and saw action on the Western Front and in Palestine. In the 1939 National Register, he was described as a carpenter and joiner living with wife Edith in Fellowes Road, Carshalton.

Career statistics

References

English Football League players
English footballers
Charlton Athletic F.C. players
British Army personnel of World War I
1898 births
1962 deaths
Sportspeople from Essex
London Regiment soldiers
Association football wing halves
Chatham Town F.C. players
English carpenters
Military personnel from Essex